These are the Australian Country number-one albums of 2021, per the ARIA Charts.

See also
2021 in music
List of number-one albums of 2021 (Australia)

References

2021
Australia country albums
Number-one country albums